Urbain Lippé (July 21, 1831 – December 20, 1896) was a Quebec notary and political figure. He represented Joliette in the House of Commons of Canada from 1891 to 1896 as a Conservative member.

He was born in L'Assomption, Lower Canada, of German descent, and was educated at the college there. In 1870, he married Marie Louise Lèvesque. Lippé served as clerk for the circuit courts for Joliette district and Joliette county and for the lower court (Cour des Commissaires) at St-Jean de Matha.

References 

The Canadian parliamentary companion, 1891 AJ Gemmill

1831 births
1896 deaths
Members of the House of Commons of Canada from Quebec
Conservative Party of Canada (1867–1942) MPs